The Norsemen (or Norse people) were a North Germanic ethnolinguistic group of the Early Middle Ages, during which they spoke the Old Norse language. The language belongs to the North Germanic branch of the Indo-European languages and is the predecessor of the modern Germanic languages of Scandinavia. During the late eighth century, Scandinavians embarked on a large-scale expansion in all directions, giving rise to the Viking Age. In English-language scholarship since the 19th century, Norse seafaring traders, settlers and warriors have commonly been referred to as Vikings. Historians of Anglo-Saxon England distinguish between Norse Vikings (Norsemen) from Norway who mainly invaded and occupied the islands north and north-west of Britain, Ireland and western Britain, and Danish Vikings, who principally invaded and occupied eastern Britain.

Modern descendants of Norsemen are the Danes, Icelanders, Faroe Islanders, Norwegians, and Swedes, who are now generally referred to as "Scandinavians" rather than Norsemen.

History of the terms Norseman and Northman 
The word Norseman first appears in English during the early 19th century: the earliest attestation given in the third edition of the Oxford English Dictionary is from Walter Scott's 1817 Harold the Dauntless. The word was coined using the adjective norse, which was borrowed into English from Dutch during the 16th century with the sense 'Norwegian', and which by Scott's time had acquired the sense "of or relating to Scandinavia or its language, esp[ecially] in ancient or medieval times". As with modern use of the word viking, therefore, the word norseman has no particular basis in medieval usage.

The term Norseman does echo terms meaning 'Northman', applied to Norse-speakers by the peoples they encountered during the Middle Ages. From this word came the name of the Normans and of Normandy, which was settled by Norsemen in the tenth century.

This form may in turn have been borrowed into Arabic: the prominent early Arabic source al-Mas‘ūdī identified the 844 raiders on Seville not only as Rūs but also .

The Anglo-Saxon Chronicle, written in Old English, distinguishes between the pagan Norwegian Norsemen (Norðmenn) of Dublin and the Christian Danes (Dene) of the Danelaw. In 942, it records the victory of King Edmund I over the Norse kings of York: "The Danes were previously subjected by force under the Norsemen, for a long time in bonds of captivity to the heathens".

Other names 

In modern scholarship, Vikings is a common term for attacking Norsemen, especially in connection with raids and monastic plundering by Norsemen in the British Isles, but it was not used in this sense at the time. In Old Norse and Old English, the word simply meant 'pirate'.

"related to rowing", or from the area of Roslagen in east-central Sweden, where most of the Northmen who visited the Eastern Slavic lands originated.

Archaeologists and historians of today believe that these Scandinavian settlements in the East Slavic lands formed the names of the countries of Russia and Belarus.

The Slavs and the Byzantines also called them Varangians (meaning "sworn men"), and the Scandinavian bodyguards of the Byzantine emperors were known as the Varangian Guard.

Modern Scandinavian usage 

Geography 

The British conception of the Vikings' origins was inaccurate. Those who plundered Britain lived in what is today Denmark, Scania, the western coast of Sweden and Norway (up to almost the 70th parallel) and along the Swedish Baltic coast up to around the 60th latitude and Lake Mälaren. They also came from the island of Gotland, Sweden. The southernmost living Vikings lived no further north than Newcastle upon Tyne, and travelled to Britain more from the east than from the north.

The Norse Scandinavians established polities and settlements in what are now Great Britain (England, Scotland, Wales), Ireland, Iceland, Russia, Belarus, France, Sicily, Belgium, Ukraine, Finland, Estonia, Latvia, Lithuania, Germany, Poland, Greenland, Canada, and the Faroe Islands.

Notable Norse people
 Aud the Deep-Minded ( CE), ship captain and early settler of Iceland
 Harald Bluetooth (died  CE), king of Denmark and Norway, namesake of the Bluetooth wireless technology
 Bolli Bollason (born  CE), prominent Icelandic warrior and member of the Varangian Guard
 Freydís Eiríksdóttir (born  CE), explorer and early colonist of Vinland
 Erik the Red ( CE), Norwegian explorer and founder of the first settlement in Greenland
 Leif Erikson ( CE), Icelandic explorer thought to have been the first European to have set foot on continental North America
 Estrid ( CE), powerful Swedish magnate and matriarch
 Harald Fairhair ( CE), the first King of Norway
 Gunnborga ( CE), Swedish runemaster responsible for the Hälsingland Rune Inscription 21
 Hildr Hrólfsdóttir ( CE), Norwegian skald known for her poetry concerning the banishment of her father Rolv Nevia, the Viking jarl of Trondheim
 Olaf the White ( CE), Viking sea-king, King of Dublin, and husband of Aud the Deep-Minded
 Ragnar Lodbrok ( CE), legendary Viking hero and king
 Þorbjörg Lítilvölva ( CE), renowned seeress of Norse colonial Greenland
 Gunnlaugr ormstunga ( CE), Icelandic skald who widely served in Iceland, Norway, Ireland, Orkney, and Sweden
 Raud the Strong ( CE), Norwegian blót priest and seafaring warrior 
 Steinunn Refsdóttir ( CE), Icelandic skald known for her verses taunting the Christian missionary Þangbrandr
 Rusla ( CE), a.k.a. the "Red Woman", legendary Norwegian pirate fleet leader
 Steinvör Sighvatsdóttir (died 1271 CE), influential Icelandic matriarch and skald
 Egill Skallagrímsson, Icelandic war poet, sorcerer, berserker, farmer, and anti-hero of Egil's Saga
 Snorri Sturluson (1179–1241), Icelandic historian, poet, politician, and lawspeaker of the Althing whose work comprises a major source of Norse mythology
 Thorkell the Tall ( CE), semi-legendary Scanian lord and Jomsviking
 Veborg (died  CE), legendary shield-maiden known for her role in the Battle of Bråvalla

See also

 Danes (Germanic tribe)
 Geats
 Goths
 Gotlander
 Haplogroup I-M253
 Norse-Gaels
 Swedes (Germanic tribe)

Notes

References

North Germanic peoples
Norsemen